Cipriano Pallavicino  (1509–1585) was a Roman Catholic prelate who served as Archbishop of Genoa (1568–1585) and Apostolic Nuncio to Naples (1566).

Biography
Cipriano Pallavicino was born in Genoa, Italy in 1509.
On 15 May 1566, he was appointed during the papacy of Pope Pius V as Apostolic Nuncio to Naples; he resigned from the position later in the same year in December 1566.
On 12 March 1568, he was consecrated bishop by Egidio Valenti, Bishop of Nepi e Sutri, with Francesco Maria Piccolomini, Bishop of Pienza, and Girolamo Garimberti, Bishop Emeritus of Gallese, serving as co-consecrators. 
On 14 November 1567, he was appointed during the papacy of Pope Pius V as Archbishop of Genoa.
He served as Archbishop of Genoa until his death on 13 November 1585.

References

External links and additional sources
 (for Chronology of Bishops) 
 (for Chronology of Bishops) 
 (for Chronology of Bishops) 

16th-century Italian Roman Catholic bishops
Bishops appointed by Pope Pius V
1509 births
1585 deaths
Apostolic Nuncios to the Kingdom of Naples
Roman Catholic archbishops of Genoa